Reverend Carlton W. Veazey is a minister in the National Baptist Convention, U.S.A., and the President of the Religious Coalition for Reproductive Choice (RCRC). Veazey founded RCRC's National Black Church Initiative.
Veazey was the 7th pastor of the Zion Baptist Church of DC from 1960 to 1993, when he was removed by vote of the membership.
Veazey is a graduate from the University of Arkansas at Pine Bluff and the  Howard University School of Divinity.

From April, 3 1970 to Aug 8, 1973 he was a Republican member of Washington, DC's appointed City Council just before the beginning of home rule, having been appointed by Nixon.

In addition to being an outspoken proponent of reproductive rights, he has also been an outspoken critic of theocracy in the United States and Christian fundamentalism.

He is a collaborator to the bulletin Religion Dispatches.

See also
 Katherine Hancock Ragsdale
 Christianity and abortion

References

Year of birth missing (living people)
Living people
American abortion-rights activists
University of Arkansas at Pine Bluff alumni
Howard University alumni
21st-century African-American writers
National Baptist Convention, USA ministers
African-American Baptist ministers
20th-century Baptist ministers from the United States
21st-century Baptist ministers from the United States